Ezenwa Ukeagu is a former professional basketball player born in Los Angeles, California.  He played for the Washington State University Cougars. He is 6'8 and 253lbs.  He was on the Nigerian National Basketball Team in 2011.

Early Years 
Ukeagu played center for Coral Springs High where he notably scored 17 points and pulled down nine rebounds per game as a senior high student. 

He was named to all-tournament team at prestigious Kreul Christmas Classic...preseason honorable All-American by Street & Smith's...selected to All-Broward County team. He is also a two-time  letter winner in basketball.

College Years 
*Played at State University of New York, Binghamton as a freshmen. Started 23 games for Binghamton University...averaged 8.2 points and a team-leading 6.9 rebounds...shot 52 percent from the field...recorded a team-high 27 blocks.

*Spent sophomore season at Palm Beach Community College. Averaged 13 points and 11 rebounds per game at Palm Beach Community College...earned all-conference honors...selected to Florida's North-South Junior College All-Star game. Was being recruited by Washington State University, St. Bonaventure University, University of Miami, Quinnipiac University, Cleveland State University and Winthrop University. He decided to attend Washington State University.

*Spent junior season at Washington State University. Earned first career start at No. 2 Arizona, Jan. 9…scored in double figures four times…collected 10 rebounds twice, against No. 2 Arizona, Feb. 8, and a week later at No. 24 Stanford…also registered two steals against the Wildcats…third among Cougars in offensive rebounds (39), defensive rebounds (58), total rebounds (97), and free throws attempts (54)…second on team in free throws made (40)... missed four games at midseason due to emergency appendectomy…ended season on high note with season-high 15 points, including shooting 7-for-8 from the free throw line, at USC, March 8…grabbed eight rebounds and added two assists against the Trojans.

*Played senior season at Washington State University. Made four starts, including three in Pac-10 action…scored in double figures four times, including three times off the bench…tied career-high with 15 points vs. Idaho, Dec. 20…added season-high eight rebounds against the Vandals…started home finale against California, March 6 and helped Cougars clinch a spot in the Pacific Life Pac-10 Tournament with 11 points, including 4-for-4 shooting, and five boards…averaged six points and three rebounds off the bench at UCLA (Feb. 5) and USC (Feb. 7) as WSU swept the Los Angeles road trip for the first time in school history…averaged 8.3 points, and five rebounds in three games at BP Top of the World Classic in Fairbanks, Alaska, Nov. 20-23…second on the team with 44 offensive rebounds and third with 93 total caroms.

Professional Years 
*2004-2005: ART Duesseldorf Magics (Germany)

*2005-2006: ART Duesseldorf Magics (Germany)

*2006-2007: ART Duesseldorf Magics (Germany)

*2007-2008: Reims Champagne Basket (France)

*2008-2009: MGS Grand-Saconnex Basket (Switzerland)

*2009-2010: Saint Vallier Basket Drome (France)

*2010: BG Karlsruhe (Germany)

*2011: ADA Blois Basket (France)

*2011: Wamsler SE Salgotarjan (Hungary)

*2011-2012: BBC Sparta Bertrange (Luxembourg)

*2012: Basket Globalcaja Quintanar (Spain)

*2013: CA Bizertin (Tunisia)

*2013-2014: Tacapes De Gabes (Tunisia)

*2014: Mineros De Caborca (Mexico)

National Team 
In 2011, Ukeagu was a member of the senior Nigerian national basketball team. The team finished the Africa Championship with a bronze medal and was the highest place the Nigerian national basketball team received at the time.

References

1981 births
Living people
Basketball players from Los Angeles
American expatriate basketball people in Germany
American expatriate basketball people in France
American expatriate basketball people in Hungary
American expatriate basketball people in Luxembourg
American expatriate basketball people in Switzerland
American men's basketball players
American people of Nigerian descent
Basketball players from Florida
Centers (basketball)
Reims Champagne Basket players
Nigerian men's basketball players
Power forwards (basketball)
Washington State Cougars men's basketball players
Sportspeople from Coral Springs, Florida